Gümüshtekin, also known as Gumushtekin (died in 1177), was an eunuch who held high offices in the Zengids' empire. Nur ad-Din,  of Aleppo, appointed him to be his lieutenant in Mosul in Iraq. After Nur ad-Din died in 1174, Gümüshtekin assumed the guardianship for Nur ad-Din's underage son, as-Salih Ismail al-Malik and took his ward from Damascus to Aleppo. He made an alliance with as-Salih's cousin Sayf al-Din Ghazi II of Mosul against Ibn al-Muqaddam who had taken control of Damascus. Ibn al-Muqaddam sought assistance from the Ayubbid ruler of Egypt, Saladin, and surrendered the city to him.

Gümüshtekin who was the governor of Aleppo and neighboring lands, had an agreement with Bohemond III of Antioch to release Raynald of Châtillon, along with Joscelin III of Courtenay and all other Christians prisoners in 1176. After Gümüshtekin had as-Salih's vizier assassinated in a play for influence over the boy, he was tortured and executed at the walls of Harem for his alleged negotiations with the Franks, or crusaders, in September 1177.

References

Sources

  

1177 deaths
Eunuchs of the Abbasid Caliphate
Rulers of Aleppo